Fran Mileta (born 14 August 2000) is a Croatian handball player for RK Nexe Našice and the Croatian national team.

In October 2019 he became the first player born in the 21st century to appear on the list for the national team. He currently plays for RK Nexe Našice in the SEHA League and the EHF Cup.

With the Croatian national junior team he arrived fourth at the 2018 European U-18 Handball Championship, and second at the 2019 Junior World Handball Championship. He was in the all-star team of the 2019 World Championship as the best right wing.

Honours

Club 
Nexe
Croatian Premier Handball League runner-up: 2020–21, 2021–22
Croatian Cup runner-up: 2021

Individual 
Best right winger of the Men's Junior World Handball Championship: 2019

References

External links
 Profile at SEHA league
 Profile at SOFA score

2000 births
Living people
Croatian male handball players
People from Labin